Mineral County Courthouse may refer to:

Mineral County Courthouse (Nevada), Hawthorne, Nevada
Mineral County Courthouse (West Virginia), Keyser, West Virginia